The Omani territory of Madha or Wādī Madḥāʾ is an exclave of the Musandam Governorate, enclaved by the United Arab Emirates (UAE); inside it, there is a second-order enclave: Nahwa, which is part of the UAE Emirate of Sharjah. Madha is located halfway between the Musandam Peninsula and the rest of Oman.

There are two exits to Madha on the Fujairah–Khorfakkan road. This territory is the only territory between UAE and Oman which is not lined with any barrier and there is no border crossing between Madha, Nahwa, or the UAE.

History
At the start of the 19th century, Madha belonged to the Qawasim of Ras Al Khaimah but the Shihuh of Dibba Bai'ah took it by force some time between 1869 and 1900. From that point, they had been aligned with the Shihuh from Dibba Bai'ah and their leader Muhammad bin Salih. The Madhanis determined that there was no point of staying with him and they needed a stronger government.

In the late 1930s or early 1940s, the leaders of the four rival clans who ruled the Musandam Peninsula (Al Qassimi of Ras Al Khaimah, Al Qassimi of Sharjah, Al Sharqi of Fujairah, and the Bu Said of Oman) gathered a group of village elders of Madha and posed a question on to which sheikhdom the Madhanis want to pose allegiance to. While all the other villages and towns around them (including the village of Nahwa that is within Madha) aligned themselves to the ruling families of Sharjah, Fujairah and Ras Al Khaimah, the Madhanis were swayed by the local representative, or wali, of the sultan of Oman Hamad bin Saif Al bu Sa'idi. The Madhanis chose Oman in the 1930s based on the firm belief that Oman was wealthier, had a stronger government, and would be better placed to protect the village's water supply. The boundary was settled in 1969 and Madha residents' decision to align with Oman made them an exclave of the Sultanate of Oman.

Madha is mostly empty, with the developed portion, called "New Madha", containing roads, a school, post office, an 'Eid ground, police station, an Omani bank, electricity and water supply, and an airstrip. There is also a Royal Oman Police patrol.

The population is less than 3,000.

In 2014, it was announced that a museum would be built to house the collection of local historian Mohammed bin Salem al Mad’hani.

Climate

References

External links

 A road sign at the entrance of the territory
 Madha in Directory of Cities and Towns in Ras al-Khaimah, United Arab Emirates 
 Some historical background on Madha and Nahwa
 Oman Explorer page on Madha

Populated places in Oman

Former Portuguese colonies
Oman–United Arab Emirates border crossings
Enclaves and exclaves
Musandam Governorate